The 2018 World Cup Taekwondo Team Championships was the 10th edition of the World Cup Taekwondo Team Championships, and was held in Fujairah, United Arab Emirates from November 24 to November 25, 2018.

Medalists

Men

Preliminary round

Group A

Group B

Knockout round

Women

Preliminary round

Group A

Group B

Knockout round

Mixed

References

External links
Official website

World Cup
World Cup Taekwondo Team Championships
Taekwondo Championships
Taekwondo